Ivan Žigeranović (born 14 August 1984) is a Serbian professional basketball player for KK Radnički Obrenovac from Serbia .

Professional career
Žigeranović started his playing career in 2002 in the Basketball League of Serbia team Ergonom. He then moved to FMP Železnik in 2006 and stayed for two seasons in the club. With them, he won the Radivoj Korać Cup in 2007. After that, he spent one season playing for Borac Čačak.

In 2009, he moved abroad for the first time in his career, playing one season for the Romanian team Gaz Metan Mediaş. In the summer of 2010, he signed a one-year contract with the Polish team Turów Zgorzelec. After that period, he had short stints in his former teams, Borac Čačak and Gaz Metan Mediaş.

On 3 July 2012 he signed a one-year deal with his former team Turów Zgorzelec. He won the Polish League in the season 2013–14. In June 2013, he extended his contract with the club for two more seasons. In February 2015, he left Turow and signed with Asesoft Ploiești for the rest of the season.

On 18 June 2015, he signed a 1+1 deal with U BT Cluj-Napoca.

References

External links

 Ivan Žigeranović at aba-liga.com
 Ivan Žigeranović at eurobasket.com
 Ivan Žigeranović at euroleague.net
 Ivan Žigeranović at fiba.com

1984 births
Living people
ABA League players
Basketball League of Serbia players
Centers (basketball)
KK Borac Čačak players
KK Ergonom players
KK FMP (1991–2011) players
KK Prokuplje players
KK Radnički Obrenovac players
People from Negotin
Serbian expatriate basketball people in Hungary
Serbian expatriate basketball people in Poland
Serbian expatriate basketball people in Romania
Serbian men's basketball players
Turów Zgorzelec players